Thog may refer to

 Thog (comics), a Marvel comics character
 the THOG problem, a logic puzzle by psychologist Peter Wason
 Thog, a character in the webcomic The Order of the Stick
 Thog, a large blue monster in The Muppet Show